Laura Ortíz-Bobadilla is a Mexican mathematician specializing in differential geometry, and especially on holomorphic foliations and the limit cycles of dynamical systems. She is a researcher in the Institute of Mathematics of the National Autonomous University of Mexico (UNAM).

Education and career
Ortíz-Bobadilla is originally from Mexico City. She completed a PhD in 1991 at the Steklov Institute of Mathematics in Moscow, Russia; her dissertation, Analytic Classification of Complex Linear Vector Fields: Case of Nontrivial Jordan Cell, was supervised by Yulij Ilyashenko.

She has been a researcher in the Institute of Mathematics since 1992.

Book
With Xavier Gómez-Mont, Ortíz-Bobadilla is the author of a Spanish-language textbook on dynamic systems on surfaces, Sistemas dinámicos holomorfos en superficies.

Recognition
Ortíz-Bobadilla is a member of the Mexican Academy of Sciences. In 2020, UNAM gave her their National University Award for Teaching in the Exact Sciences.

References

External links

Year of birth missing (living people)
Living people
Mexican mathematicians
Mexican women mathematicians
National Autonomous University of Mexico alumni
Steklov Institute of Mathematics alumni
Differential geometers
Members of the Mexican Academy of Sciences